The 1932 Drake Bulldogs football team was an American football team that represented Drake University in the Missouri Valley Conference (MVC) during the 1932 college football season. In its first and only season under head coach Evan O. Williams, the team compiled a 2–6–1 record (1–3–1 against MVC opponents), finished in fifth place in the conference, and was outscored by a total of 196 to 57.

Schedule

References

Drake
Drake Bulldogs football seasons
Drake Bulldogs football